Daza (also known as Dazaga) is a Nilo-Saharan language spoken by the Daza people inhabiting northern Chad. The Daza are also known as the Gouran (Gorane) in Chad. Dazaga is spoken by around 380,000 people, primarily in the Djurab Desert region and the Borkou region, locally called Haya or Faya-Largeau northern-central Chad, the capital of the Dazaga people. Dazaga is spoken in the Tibesti Mountains of Chad (330,000 speakers), in eastern Niger near N'guigmi and to the north (50,000 speakers). It is also spoken to a smaller extent in Libya and in Sudan, where there is a community of 3,000 speakers in the city of Omdurman. There's also a small diaspora community working in Jeddah, Saudi Arabia.

The two primary dialects of the Dazaga language are Daza and Kara, but there are several other mutually intelligible dialects, including Kaga, Kanobo, Taruge and Azza. It is closely related to the Tedaga language, spoken by the Teda, the other out of the two Toubou people groups, who reside primarily in the Tibesti Mountains of northern Chad and in southern Libya near the city of Sabha.

Dazaga is a Nilo-Saharan language and a member of the Western Saharan branch of the Saharan subgroup which also contains the Kanuri language, Kanembu language and Tebu languages. Tebu is further divided into Tedaga and Dazaga. The Eastern Saharan branch includes the Zaghawa language and Berti language.

Vocabulary
The dialects spoken in Chad and Niger have some French influence whereas the dialects spoken in Libya and Sudan have more of an Arabic influence. The Dazaga language was not traditionally a written language but in recent years the SIL had developed an orthography.  The majority of Dazaga speakers are bilingual or multilingual in their native tongue along with either Arabic, French, Zaghawa, Hausa, Zarma, Kanuri or Tuareg. There are thus many borrowings from other languages such as Arabic, Hausa or French. For example, the word for "thank you" is borrowed from Arabic shokran and incorporated into the language by usually being followed by the suffix -num marking the second person.The following tables contain words from the Daza dialect spoken in Omdurman, Sudan. This romanisation is not standard.

Numbers

Basic words and phrases

Phonology

Consonants

Vowels

References

External links
Relative Clauses in Dazaga  

Tebu languages
Saharan languages
Languages of Chad
Languages of Niger
Toubou people